Alasdair Dickinson (born 11 September 1983) is a Scottish rugby union coach.  He was previously a Scotland international rugby union player; and played for the clubs Edinburgh Rugby, Gloucester and Sale Sharks.  He played as a prop.

Rugby Union career

Amateur career

Dickinson played for Dundee HSFP and Heriot's FP. He is a product of the Scottish Institute of Sport.

Professional career

Dickinson played professionally for Edinburgh Rugby from 2003.

Dickinson signed for Gloucester Rugby from Edinburgh for the 2007–08 season. 2008–09 really saw him force his way into the Gloucester first team to a regular basis as he made 20 appearances in total.

Dickinson moved to Sale Sharks for the 2011–12 season, joining international teammates Fraser McKenzie and Richie Vernon.

Dickinson rejoined Edinburgh Rugby from the Sale Sharks for the 2013–14 season.

In 2016 Dickinson had suffered a shoulder injury which prevented him from playing for the duration of the 2016–17 season. On his return in 2017 he aggravated a foot injury. He retired from playing in 2018.

International career

Dickinson made his Scotland debut against New Zealand at the RWC 2007. He was a late replacement to the squad, made when Allan Jacobsen was injured. He made 58 appearances for Scotland and played in 93 World Cups.

Coaching career

On his playing retirement Dickinson became a scrum coach, working with  Scotland Women, Scotland U20s and the Scottish Rugby Academies.

Dickinson became a scrum coach for Bristol Bears in 2020.

On 19 April 2021 it was announced that Dickinson would join Glasgow Warriors as scrum coach in the summer of 2021.

References

External links
Gloucester Rugby profile
Scotland profile

1983 births
Living people
Alumni of Edinburgh Napier University
Dundee HSFP players
Edinburgh Rugby players
Gloucester Rugby players
Heriot's RC players
People educated at the High School of Dundee
Rugby union players from Dundee
Sale Sharks players
Scotland international rugby union players
Scottish rugby union players
Rugby union props